Machine 15 is the seventh studio album by Swedish punk rock band Millencolin.

Release
Machine 15 was made available for streaming on 1 May through the band's Myspace profile. It was released in 2008 on various dates in different regions: 22 March in Australia, 7 April in Europe, 6 May in North America, and 21 May in Japan. Millencolin recorded parts of the album with the Swedish Chamber Orchestra from Örebro. A limited edition version included a DVD of a live performance in Stockholm in 2003. In March 2009, the band went on a tour of North America.

Track listing 
All songs written by Nikola Sarcevic, except where noted. 
 "Machine 15" - 2:29
 "Done is Done" - 3:50
 "Detox" - 3:37
 "Vicious Circle" - 4:11
 "Broken World" (Mathias Färm) - 3:08
 "Come On" - 3:38
 "Centerpiece" - 0:10
 "Who's Laughing Now" (Färm, Sarcevic) - 3:07
 "Brand New Game" (Färm, Sarcevic) - 3:28
 "Ducks & Drakes" - 3:18
 "Turnkey Paradise" (Färm, Sarcevic) - 3:15
 "Route One" - 3:30
 "Danger for Stranger" - 2:59
 "Saved by Hell" - 3:38
 "End Piece" - 1:32

Bonus tracks
"Machine 15" (acoustic) (Japanese release)
"Farewell My Hell" (acoustic)  (Japanese release) 
"Mind the Mice" - 3:32  (iTunes bonus track)

Limited edition DVD track listing
All songs performed live in Stockholm in 2003.
 "No Cigar" - 3:45
 "Bullion" - 1:57
 "Man or Mouse" -  2:58
 "Material Boy" - 2:14
 "Duckpond" - 2:47
 "Kemp" - 4:14

Personnel

Millencolin
Nikola Sarcevic – lead vocals, bass, percussion, keyboards
Erik Ohlsson – guitar, keyboards, album artwork
Mathias Färm – guitar, percussion, keyboards, assistant engineer, editing
Fredrik Larzon – drums, percussion

Additional musicians
Roger Olsson – violin
Hans Elvkull – violin
Linn Elvkull – viola
Hanna Thorell – cello

Production
Lou Giordano – producer and engineer, percussion, keyboards 
Michael Libert – mixing at Hansa Mixroom
Jim Brumby – assistant engineer, editing
Thomas Maringer – assistant engineer
George Marino – mastering at Sterlin Sound
Dino Medanhodzic – editing

References

External links

Machine 15 at YouTube (streamed copy where licensed)

Millencolin albums
2008 albums
Epitaph Records albums
Burning Heart Records albums